Lounging or Loungin' may refer to:
"Loungin'", a song from Guru's Jazzmatazz, Vol. 1
"Loungin", a song by LL Cool J
"Loungin'", a song by Aim from his album FabricLive.17

See also
Lounge (disambiguation)